Buzenda (豊前田, ぶぜんだ) refers to the downtown area of Shimonoseki City, Japan. It is located in the Shimonoseki Station area, and it is known as the most famous downtown area in Yamaguchi Prefecture. 
There are izakaya, karaoke bars, and other social venues around Buzenda-cho-2.

Sightseeing

Shops
 Buzenda Shopping Street (Shinsaku-Dori)
The Buzenda shopping street includes a lot of famous fugu restaurants and  seafood restaurants, etc.
 Daiso (100-yen shop, Over 2,350m2)
 EDION(home electronics store)

Sightseeing
 Kaikyo Yume Tower (Kaikyo Messe Shimonoseki)

Hotels
Most hotels and inns are around Shimonoseki Station and Karato. 
 Toyoko Inn Shimonoseki-eki Higashi-guchi

Others
 Kaikyo Messe Shimonoseki International Trade Building
 YM Securities Co.,Ltd.(head office)
 NHK Shimonoseki Branch Office
 JETRO Yamaguchi
 Passport Center
 Yamaguchi Asahi Broadcasting Shimonoseki branch office
 Nishi-chugoku Shinkin Bank(head office)
 Sompo Japan Shimonoseki Building

Festivals
Shimonoseki Kaikyo Festival (May)
Kanmon Kaikyo Fireworks Festival (August)
Shimonoseki Bakan Festival (August)
Shimonoseki Kaikyo Marathon (November)

Transportation

Ferries from Shimonoseki Port International Terminal
The Kanpu ferry to Pusan in South Korea regularly.
The Orient ferry to Qingdao in China regularly.
The Orient ferry to Shanghai in China regularly.

Trains
Nearby station
Shimonoseki Station(Sanyō Main Line)
Nearby Shinkansen Station
Shin-Shimonoseki Station(Sanyō Shinkansen)

Buses
Nearby bus stop
“Buzenda”(Sanden Kohtsu Co.,Ltd.)

See also
Shimonoseki city
Shimonoseki Station

External links
 Shimonoseki official website in Japanese
 Shimonoseki official website in other languages
 

Geography of Yamaguchi Prefecture
Tourist attractions in Yamaguchi Prefecture